Lanskey is a suburb in the City of Mount Isa, Queensland, Australia.

Geography 
The Leichhard River flows north–south through the town of Mount Isa, dividing the suburbs of the town into "mineside" (west of the Leichhardt River) and "townside" (east of the Leichhardt River). Lanskey is a "townside" suburb.

History 
Lanskey was named on 1 September 1973 by the Queensland Place Names Board after grazier Mr Lanskey. On 16 March 2001 the status of Menzies was changed from a locality to a suburb.

References 

City of Mount Isa
Suburbs in Queensland